WDRE (100.5 FM, "The Drive") is a radio station  broadcasting an alternative rock format. Licensed to Susquehanna, Pennsylvania, United States, the station serves the Binghamton area.  The station is currently owned by Equinox Broadcasting Corporation.

History
The station went on the air as WXEJ on July 2, 1992.  On April 14, 1995, the station changed its call sign to WMTT, on April 8, 1996, to WCDW, and on August 16, 2013, to the current WDRE.

The Drive was formerly known as 100.5 The Met, CD 100, and later as Cool 100. From May 1995 until early 1996, The Met aired a Classic Hits format leaning heavily on rock from the 70's and 80's (similar to Rock without the Hard Edge). Early in 1996 the station changed formats, and was known as CD 100. CD 100 played a modern rock format, until a vote was taken and the format was flipped to oldies. From then, the station was known as Cool 100. On June 18, 2013, Cool 100 was simulcasted on the former WRRQ, until the format changed once again in August 2013.

On August 16, 2013 WCDW changed their call letters to WDRE, and also changed formats from oldies, back to alternative rock.

Translators
In addition to the main station, WDRE is relayed by additional translators to widen its broadcast area.

References

External links

DRE
Radio stations established in 1992